Amadeo Lladós Sánchez-Toscano is a Grand Prix motorcycle racer from Spain.

Career statistics

By season

Races by year

References

External links

Spanish motorcycle racers
Living people
1991 births
Moto2 World Championship riders